Ejutla de Crespo  is a city and a municipality of the same name, in the central valleys of the Mexican state of Oaxaca. 
It is part of the Ejutla District in the south of the Valles Centrales Region.

"Ejutla" is from the Nahuatl exotl and tla, meaning "place of abundant green beans"; "Crespo" is for Fr. Manuel Sabino Crespo, who fought alongside Morelos in the War of Independence and was executed on 19 October 1815 and in whose memory  the State Congress decreed a change in the name from Villa de Ejutla to Heroica Ciudad de Ejutla de Crespo on 11 December 1885.

The town
The settlement was founded in 524 by the Zapotecs under Meneyadia.

The municipality

As municipal seat, Ejutla has governing jurisdiction over the following communities:

Agua Rica, Ampliación del Progreso, Barranca Larga, Barrio Chino, Cerro Yaniche, El Arrogante Justo Benítez, El Cabrito, El Cerro de las Huertas, El Palenque, El Progreso (Barrio de Coapa), El Puente, El Saúz, El Tortuguero, El Vergel, Guelaxico, Hacienda Vieja, Higo Mocho (Piedra Cuache), La Capilla, La Cieneguilla, La Ermita, La Escalera, La Lobera, La Noria, La Noria de Ortiz, Los Ocotes, Monte del Toro, Nuevo Venustiano Carranza, Rancho Brujo (El Brujo), Rancho Nogal (Los Jarquines), Rinconada de San Diego, San Joaquín, San Juan Coatecas Bajas, San Juan Logolava, San Matías Chilazoa, Santa Cruz Nexila, Santa Marta Chichihualtepec, and Yegoseve

References

External links

Municipalities of Oaxaca
6th-century establishments in Central America
Populated places established in the 6th century